Dan Kurzius (born 1971/1972) is an American billionaire businessman, the co-founder and chief customer officer of Mailchimp.

Early life
Kurzius's father ran a bakery-deli in Albuquerque, New Mexico that was "eventually forced out of business by big bakery chains", and he had a fatal heart attack a few years later, when Dan was 14.

Career
Kurzius started out as a DJ then worked in real estate.

In 2001, Kurzius and Ben Chestnut were running a web design company and founded Mailchimp, which they own jointly, as a sideline. The company has always been self-funding, and has never had any outside funding.

As of March 2019, Forbes estimates Kurzius' net worth at $2.1 billion which makes him one of 13 residents from Georgia that are included in Forbes' 33rd annual ranking of the world's billionaires.

Personal life
Kurzius is married with two daughters, and lives in Atlanta, Georgia.

He collects vintage skateboards.

References

1970s births
Living people
American billionaires
American technology company founders
American computer businesspeople
People from Albuquerque, New Mexico